Roman Sorkin (born August 11, 1996) is a Belarusian-born Israeli professional basketball player for Maccabi Tel Aviv of the Israeli Basketball Premier League and the EuroLeague. He played college basketball for the University of Oregon, before playing professionally in Israel.

Early life and college career
Sorkin was born to Jewish parents in Minsk, Belarus. At the age of two, he immigrated to Israel, and grew up in Ashdod, Israel.

Sorkin played four years of college basketball at the University of Oregon. On November 10, 2017, Sorkin recorded a career-high 23 points and seven rebounds in his career start, while shooting 8-of-9 from the field, in a 70–54 win over Coppin State. In his college career, he had a 56.9% two-point shooting percentage, and shot 83.3% from the line.

Professional career

Maccabi Haifa (2018–2021)
On April 28, 2018, Sorkin started his professional career with Maccabi Haifa of the Israeli Premier League, signing a three-year deal. That season, Haifa finished the season in the last place out of 12 teams and was relegated to the Israeli National League (the second-tier league in Israel).

On April 12, 2019, Sorkin recorded a season-high 19 points, while shooting 7-of-11 from the field, along with eight rebounds in a 77–79 loss to Hapoel Afula. In 30 games played during the 2018–19 season, he averaged 8.4 points and 4.4 rebounds per game. Sorkin won the 2019 Israeli National League Championship title with Haifa, earning a promotion back to the Israeli Premier League.

On December 8, 2019, Sorkin scored a game-winner shot with 1.6 seconds left, giving Haifa a 77–75 win over Hapoel Be'er Sheva. On February 3, 2020, Sorkin recorded a career-high 22 points, while shooting 6-of-6 from three point range, along with five rebounds in a 93–84 win over Hapoel Gilboa Galil.

Maccabi Tel Aviv (2021–present)
On July 21, 2021, Sorkin signed a one-year contract with Maccabi Tel Aviv of the Israeli Premier League and the EuroLeague, with an option for an additional season.

National team career
Sorkin was a member of the Israeli under-18 and under-20 national teams.

In August 2014, Sorkin participated in the 2014 FIBA Europe Under-18 Championship Division B, where he averaged 14.1 points and 9.9 rebounds per game.

Career statistics

EuroLeague

|-
| style="text-align:left;"|2021–22
| style="text-align:left;" rowspan=2|Maccabi
| 22 || 1 || 8.3 || .548 || .300 || .583 || 1.8 || .2 || .3 || .3 || 2.9 || 3.2
|-
| style="text-align:left;"| 2022–23
| 13 || 4 || 17.5 || .656 || .000 || 750 || 3.8 || 1.2 || .5 || 1.2 || 6.9 || 10.6
|- class="sortbottom"
| style="text-align:center;" colspan=2| Career
| 35 || 5 || 11.7 || .613 || .214 || .625 || 2.5 || .6 || .4 || .7 || 4.4 || 6.0

References

External links
 EuroLeague profile
 Oregon Ducks bio
 RealGM profile

1996 births
Living people
Basketball players from Minsk
Belarusian emigrants to Israel
Centers (basketball)
Israeli expatriate basketball people in the United States
Israeli men's basketball players
Israeli people of Soviet descent
Maccabi Haifa B.C. players
Maccabi Tel Aviv B.C. players
Oregon Ducks men's basketball players
Power forwards (basketball)
Sportspeople from Ashdod